The Third Sharif provincial cabinet was formed by Shehbaz Sharif in 2013 to begin a new government following the 2013 Pakistani general election.

Cabinet

Ministers
 Arslan Mushtaq Khan
 Sher Ali Khan
 Tanveer Aslam Malik
 Malik Mukhtar Ahmad Bherath
 Muhammad Asif Malik
 Rana Sana Ullah Khan
 Sardar Muhammad Ayub Khan Ghadi
 Hameeda Waheeduddin
 Khawaja Imran Nazeer
 Bilal Yasin
 Mian Mujtaba Shuja ur Rehman
 Rana Mashood Ahmad Khan
 Zaeem Qadri
 Sheikh Allauddin
 Syed Raza Ali Gillani
 Mian Yawar Zaman
 Naghma Mushtaq
 Malik Nadeem Kamran
 Mian Atta Muhammad Manika
 Farrukh Javed
 Muhammad Naeem Akhtar Khan Bhabha
 Asif Saeed Manais
 Malik Ahmad Yar Hunjra
 Syed Haroon Ahmed Sultan Bokhari
 Mahar Ijaz Ahmad Achlana
 Malik Muhammad Iqbal Channar
 Chaudhry Muhammad Shafique
 Zakia Shahnawaz Khan
 Khalil Tahir Sandhu
 Amanat Ullah Khan Shadi Khel
 Aisha Ghaus Pasha
 Muhammad Mansha Ullah Butt
 Khawaja Salman Rafique
 Jahangir Khanzada

References

2013 establishments in Pakistan
Shehbaz Sharif
Cabinets established in 2013
2010s in Pakistani politics
Cabinets disestablished in 2018
Punjab, Pakistan ministries